Silvia Cecchini (born 12 October 1994) is an Italian professional racing cyclist.

See also
 Top Girls Fassa Bortolo

References

External links
 

1994 births
Living people
Italian female cyclists
Place of birth missing (living people)
Cyclists from Friuli Venezia Giulia
People from the Province of Udine